A by-election was held for the New South Wales Legislative Assembly electorate of Glebe on 10 September 1904 because James Hogue had been appointed Chief Secretary in the Carruthers ministry. Until 1907, members appointed to a ministerial position were required to face a by-election. These were generally uncontested.  On this occasion a poll was required in Bingara (Samuel Moore), Glebe and Tenterfield (Charles Lee) and all were comfortably re-elected. The four other ministers, Joseph Carruthers (St George), James Ashton (Goulburn), Broughton O'Conor (Sherbrooke) and Charles Wade (Gordon), were re-elected unopposed.

Vincent Taylor was considered a vexatious candidate. He was a candidate at the 1901 election for Sydney-King, receiving 4 votes. and the for the Belmore Ward of the Sydney City Council, receiving just 3 votes.

Dates

Result

James Hogue was appointed Chief Secretary in the Carruthers ministry.

Aftermath
These were the final ministerial by-elections as the Constitution of New South Wales was amended to exempt any office of the executive government created by an Act of Parliament from being an office of profit under the crown, disqualifying a person from sitting in parliament.

See also
Electoral results for the district of Glebe

Notes

References

1904 elections in Australia
New South Wales state by-elections
1900s in New South Wales